The Journal of African Media Studies is a triannual peer-reviewed academic journal covering historical and contemporary aspects of media and communication in Africa. It was established in 2009 and is published by Intellect. The founder and editor-in-chief is Winston Mano (University of Westminster).

Abstracting and indexing
The journal is abstracted and indexed in:

According to the Journal Citation Reports, the journal has a 2021 impact factor of 0.641.

References

External links
 

English-language journals
Publications established in 2009
African studies journals
Triannual journals